Gоlemo Mramorani is a former village in Municipality of Dolneni.

Villages in Dolneni Municipality